The twentieth cycle of America's Next Top Model (subtitled as America's Next Top Model: Guys & Girls and stylized as ANTM 2.0) premiered on August 2, 2013. It was the 14th season to air on The CW. Tyra Banks, Kelly Cutrone, Bryanboy, and Rob Evans all returned as judges. As in the previous cycle, public voting was still a factor in eliminations. This was the first cycle of the show to feature male contestants. Tyra indicated in an interview that a school version called LeGore's Next Top Model (2011), inspired her to start including male contestants. The international destination for this cycle was Bali, Indonesia, the first visit in Southeast Asia since cycle 6.

The prizes for this cycle included a modeling contract with NEXT Model Management, a spread in Nylon magazine, and a US$100,000 campaign with Guess.

The winner of the competition was 19-year-old Jourdan Miller from Bend, Oregon with Marvin Cortes placing as runner up.

Contestants
(Ages stated are at start of contest)

Episodes

The Comeback Series
Much like the previous cycle, The Comeback Series also returned online with Bryanboy as its host. The web series follows the eliminated models as they participate in the photo shoots. This season, the audience enabled two eliminated models, one male and one female, to return to the competition. For having accumulated the highest social media score average, Alex was allowed to return to the competition at the end of episode 8. Immediately after her comeback, it was revealed that one additional male contestant would also be given the opportunity to return. In episode 10, the episode following the season recap, it was revealed that Jeremy was the male model who would be returning to the competition.
 	

Note: Bianca and Chris S. did not participate in the Comeback Series.

Summaries

Call-out order

 The contestant was eliminated
 The contestant was eliminated outside of the judging panel
 The contestant won the competition

Bottom two/three

 The contestant was eliminated after their first time in the bottom two
 The contestant was eliminated after their second time in the bottom two
 The contestant was eliminated after their third time in the bottom two
 The contestant was eliminated in the final judging and placed as the runner-up

Average call-out order

Casting call-out order, comeback first call-outs and final two are not included.

Scoring chart

 Indicates the contestant won the competition.
 Indicates the contestant had the highest score that week.
 Indicates the contestant was in the bottom two that week.
 Indicates the contestant was eliminated that week.

Photo shoot guide
Episode 1 was split into two parts:
First part: Masquerade fashion show (casting)
Second part: Leather outfits (casting)
Episode 2 photo shoot: Alternative weddings
Episode 3 photo shoot: S&M fashion with Alessandra Ambrosio and Rob Evans
Episode 4 photo shoot: Trailer park chic
Episode 5 commercial: Questionable Body Spray gender role reversal
Episode 6 photo shoot: Nail art beauty shots
Episode 7 photo shoot: Splashing body paint   
Episode 8 photo shoot: Magical field couture
Episode 10 photo shoot: Flawsome with Zendaya and Shaun Ross
Episode 11 photo shoot: Animorphs with endangered animals
Episode 12 photo shoot: Rice paddy couture
Episode 13 photo shoot: Hanging upside-down with bats
Episode 14 photo shoots: Guess campaign; Nylon magazine spreads
Episode 15 photo shoot: Feral and wild in the jungle

Makeovers
 Chlea – Long wavy honey blonde weave
 Mike – Amber highlights
 Kanani – Pixie cut
 Jiana – Long bob cut and dyed darker
 Phil – Shoulder length wavy brown weave
 Alexandra – Dyed chocolate brown
 Don – Dyed blonde with lighter facial hair
 Nina – Layered with bangs and dyed red
 Jeremy – Trimmed & lightened with highlights
 Renee – Straightened and dyed black
 Chris H. – Dyed ice blonde
 Cory – Shaved bald
 Marvin – A fade
 Jourdan – Dyed honey blonde

Notes

References

America's Next Top Model
2013 American television seasons
Television shows filmed in California
Television shows filmed in Indonesia